The 2019 Rajyotsava Awards ceremony took place at the Ravindra Kalakshetra on 1 November 2019. Awarded annually by the Government of Karnataka, the ceremony saw 64 individuals being awarded for achievements in various fields. The number was chosen to mark the 64th anniversary of the formation of the State of Karnataka.

List of awardees

Individual

Organisations/Associations

References

Rajyotsava Award
Recipients of the Rajyotsava Award 2019